This timeline shows the whole history of the universe, the Earth, and mankind in one table. Each row is defined in years ago, that is, years before the present date, with the earliest times at the top of the chart. In each table cell on the right, references to events or notable people are given, more or less in chronological order within the cell.

Each row corresponds to a change in log (time before present, that is, the logarithm of the time before the present) of about 0.1 (using base 10 logarithm). The dividing points are taken from the R′′20 Renard numbers. Thus each row represent about 21% of the time from its beginning until the present.

The table is divided into sections with subtitles. Note that each such section contains about 68% of all the time from the beginning of the section until now.

Past

13,800 million years ago to 5500 million years ago

5500 million years ago to 1800 million years ago

1800 million years ago to 550 million years ago

550 million years ago to 180 million years ago

180 million years ago to 55 million years ago

55 million years ago to 18 million years ago

18 million years ago to 5.5 million years ago

5.5 million years ago to 1.8 million years ago

1.8 million years ago to 550,000 years ago

550,000 years ago to 180,000 years ago

180,000 years ago to 55,000 years ago

55,000 years ago to 18,000 years ago

18,000 years ago to 5,500 years ago

5,500 years ago to 1,800 years ago

1,800 years ago to 550 years ago

550 years ago to 180 years ago

180 years ago to 55 years ago

56 years ago to 19 years ago

19 years ago to present

Future
A logarithmic timeline can also be devised for events which should occur in the future, barring unforeseen circumstances and assuming that we can extrapolate into the future based on our science.

See also

 Geologic time scale#Table of geologic time
 List of timelines
 Logarithmic timeline
 Orders of magnitude (time)
 Technological singularity
 Timeline of the evolutionary history of life
 Chronology of the universe
 World history
 Timeline of the far future
 Future of an expanding universe

References

External links
Interview with Heinz von Foerster 
Detailed logarithmic timeline of the Universe

Historical timelines